Long Apung is one of the villages in the Malinau Regency, in the North Kalimantan province of Indonesia.

References

Long Apung